Hannes Wulf Müller (born 18 May 2000) is a German field hockey player.

Career

Club level
In club competition, Müller plays for Uhlenhorster HC in the German Bundesliga.

Junior national team
Hannes Müller made his debut for the German U–21 team in 2017. His first appearance was during a test series against Russia in Frankfurt. He went on to win a bronze medal at the EuroHockey Junior Championship in Valencia later that year.

Müller represented the side again in 2019 at an invitational tournament in Madrid, as well as the EuroHockey Junior Championship in Valencia, where he won a gold medal.

In 2021, alongside Benedikt Schwarzhaupt, Müller captained the team at the FIH Junior World Cup in Bhubaneswar. At the tournament, Germany won a silver medal.

Die Honamas
Hannes Müller made his debut for Die Honamas in 2018 during a test series against Ireland in Dublin.

He returned to the senior squad in 2021 during season two of the FIH Pro League.

References

External links

2000 births
Living people
German male field hockey players
Male field hockey midfielders
Uhlenhorster HC players
Men's Feldhockey Bundesliga players
People from Köthen (Anhalt)
Sportspeople from Saxony-Anhalt
2023 Men's FIH Hockey World Cup players
21st-century German people